Ptychobela dancei is a species of sea snail, a marine gastropod mollusk in the family Pseudomelatomidae, the turrids and allies.

Description
The length of the shell attains 21 mm.

Distribution
This species occurs in the Indian Ocean off Oman and Somalia.

References

 Kilburn, R.N.; Dekker, H. (2008). New species of turrid conoideans (Gastropoda, Conoidea) from the Red Sea and Arabia. Basteria, 72(1-3), 1-19

External links
 Gastropods.com: Ptychobela dancei

dancei
Gastropods described in 2008